Vladan Savić (Cyrillic: Владан Савић; born 26 July 1979) is a Montenegrin retired footballer.

Club career
He played for hometown club FK Berane as well as for Kecskeméti TE, FK Budućnost Podgorica, FK Mladost Apatin, FK Spartak Subotica and FK Voždovac.

External links
 Profile at HLSZ

1979 births
Living people
People from Berane
Association football midfielders
Serbia and Montenegro footballers
Montenegrin footballers
FK Berane players
FK Budućnost Podgorica players
FK Mladost Apatin players
FK Spartak Subotica players
FK Voždovac players
Kecskeméti TE players
Second League of Serbia and Montenegro players
First League of Serbia and Montenegro players
Serbian SuperLiga players
Nemzeti Bajnokság I players
Montenegrin expatriate footballers
Expatriate footballers in Serbia
Montenegrin expatriate sportspeople in Serbia
Expatriate footballers in Hungary
Montenegrin expatriate sportspeople in Hungary